RED DOG SQUADRON is a non-profit Los Angeles theatre company founded in 2002 by Brad Raider and James Roday Rodriguez who also serve as co-Artistic Directors. The two friends met while studying at The Experimental Theatre Wing at New York University and have been frequent collaborators since.

In New York, they produced the 400th anniversary production of Henry V which starred Raider as “Henry,” Niamh McCormally as “Katherine,” and a cast of 25 actors. It opened on Saint Crispin's Day – October 25, 1999 at the Mazer Theatre Off Broadway under the direction of Laurie Wessely. It was performed 400 years after Shakespeare wrote it in 1599.

After moving to Los Angeles, Raider and Rodriguez (then known professionally as James Roday) officially launched RED DOG with their inaugural production of David Mamet's Sexual Perversity in Chicago, a revival in which they both starred. The play also featured Niamh McCormally as “Deborah” and Lilli Birdsell as “Joan.” It premiered in December 2002 at the Stella Adler Studio Theatre in Hollywood under the direction of Raider. Next came two original one-acts – Chickens and Assholes and Sustenance performed together in 2004. Chickens, written and directed by Aaron Saidman, featured Rodriguez, Mackenzie Astin, Vivian Bang, and Freeman Michaels. Sustenance, written and directed by Rodriguez, featured Raider, Niamh McCormally, Dana Ashbrook, Jackson Bennett, Renee J. Tan, Todd Harthan, and Amanda Detmer.

In 2007, they produced the world premiere of Grand Delusion at the Lost Studio Theatre in Los Angeles. Written by David Rock, the black comedy re-imagined the events leading up to World War I and starred Kurt Fuller as Kaiser Wilhelm, Xander Berkeley as Czar Nicholas, and Timothy Omundson as Count Rumpledorf.

In 2009, the sold-out and critically acclaimed Extinction, written by Gabe McKinley and directed by Wayne Kasserman, had its world premiere at the Elephant Theatre in Hollywood where it ran for four weeks before moving Off Broadway to the Cherry Lane Theatre February 13 through March 14, 2010. It starred Rodriguez, Michael Weston, Amanda Detmer, and Stefanie E. Frame.

Another sold-out run for RED DOG, Greedy by Karl Gajdusek, ran January 8  through January 29, 2011 at the El Centro Theatre in Hollywood. Under the direction of Rodriguez, it starred Detmer, Raider, Maggie Lawson, Kurt Fuller, Peter Mackenzie, and Ivana Miličević.

In 2012, the company produced "Artificial Fellow Traveler", written and performed by Ethan Sandler, which ran February 20 through March 12 under the direction of Daniel Goldstein. The one-man-show was performed at Big Daddy's Antiques in Los Angeles.

In the same year, Rodriguez and Black Dahlia artistic director Matt Shakman bought the El Centro Theatre and started a long process of renovations with the intend of reopening it under its original name Circle Theatre. In a newsletter from August 2018, Raider and Rodriguez announced that they had to resell the theatre in early 2018.

After a quiet six years, 2018 saw the resurgence of RDS with the West Coast premiere of William Francis Hoffman's "Cal in Camo". It ran October 13 through November 16 at VS. Theatre under the direction of Amy K Harmon, starring Tim Cummings, Bree Turner, Brad Raider, and Andrew Thacher.

Production history
Henry V (1999)
Sexual Perversity in Chicago (2002)
Chickens and Assholes (2004)
Sustenance (2004)
Grand Delusion (2007)
Extinction (2009/2010)
Greedy (2011)
Artificial Fellow Traveler (2012)
Cal in Camo (2018)
Great Kills (2019/2020)

References

External links
 Official Website
 Broadway World
 LA Stage Scene
 LA Times

Theatre companies in Los Angeles